The Ferrari GTO (often referred to as Ferrari 288 GTO) (Type F114) is an exotic homologation of the Ferrari 308 GTB produced from 1984 until 1987 in Ferrari's Maranello factory, designated GT for Gran Turismo and O for Omologata (homologated in Italian).

Background 

Contrary to what is reported historically in the press, the Ferrari GTO was not immediately born to compete in the new 1982 Group B Circuit Race series; Enzo Ferrari did not have overall control of the Road Car division, which was at the time managed by the General Director Eugenio Alzati and the FIAT MD (CEO) Vittorio Ghidella. In 1983 Mr Ferrari noted from discussions with close friends and clients that the road car sales were falling due to stronger competition from rival car makers and what he described as the "excessive gentrification" of the Ferrari model lineup.

Turbocharging: from F1 to road cars 
The success of turbocharging in Formula 1 and the introduction of some new tax laws (above the 1999cc displacement threshold) had prompted Ferrari to first build the 208 Turbo and then discuss turbocharging also in 3 litre form for a road car which could produce 330 bhp. The first 208 turbo did not feature an intercooler so the performance and reliability was somewhat delicate due to high combustion temperatures. Ferrari approached the head of powertrain for the Gestione Sportiva (Racing Division), Nicola Materazzi, to give an opinion on the proposed specification for the new 3L turbo engine. Materazzi had joined from Osella in 1979 (before then at Lancia Reparto Corse) due to his experience with forced induction and had been involved in the 126 F1 car experimentation between Comprex and turbo. When Materazzi showed confidence that 400 bhp could be reliably extracted from 3000cc (133 bhp/litre), Ferrari placed his trust in him on condition that it would deliver as promised. Ferrari also jokingly suggested that Materazzi work on the 268 engine destined for the Lancia LC2 Group C racing car, due to similarities in displacement and mechanical parts.

Development 
The Ferrari F114B road-car engine and the Lancia 2.6L V8 race engine developments progressed closely, with some draughtsmen employed from Abarth to complete detail design on components for manufacture at times when the Ferrari draughtsmen were at full capacity. In order to improve overall performance, several key aspects of the original 308 vehicle layout were altered: the engine did not grow in displacement but was turbocharged, it remained mid-mounted but now longitudinally instead of transversely, the wheelbase was elongated by 200 mm, the outer bodywork required modifications to maintain pleasing proportions. The car used water-cooled IHI turbochargers from Japan compared to the KKK turbochargers used in Formula 1 due to the better materials and aerodynamic internal designs which allowed faster transient response. IHI had bought patents from Swiss manufacturer Brown Boveri (Baden) that had supplied Ferrari with the Comprex systems.

Some of the GTO's styling features were first displayed on a 308 GTB design exercise by Pininfarina shown at the 1977 Geneva Auto Salon. The 288 GTO had started out as a modified version of the 308/328 to hold down costs and to build the car quickly, but little of the 308/328 was left when the 288 GTO was finished. Fortunately Ferrari could count on customers who were loyal when it came to spending more if they could access performance and style that was unmatched, so the unplanned deviation from the original cost targets did not necessarily prove an issue.

Easily noticeable differences were the GTOs bulging fender flares, larger front/rear spoilers, large "flag-style" outside mirrors and four driving lights at the far sides of the grille. Retained from the original 250 GTO were slanted air vents, put in the GTO's rear fenders to cool the brakes, as well as the rear wing's design, borrowed from the 250 GTO's original wing. The GTO also had wider body panels than the 308's because they had to cover much larger Goodyear tires mounted on racing wheels. The suspension's height could be set higher for road use and lower for racing on tracks. Bodywork material was new and lighter for better acceleration and handling. Steel was used just for the doors because major body panels were made from molded fiberglass. Kevlar was used for the hood, and the roof was made from Kevlar and carbon fiber.

Materazzi felt that with the latest road speed limits and stricter fines, it was increasingly harder for clients to really prove the potential of cars with high performance. Ferrari asked what was his proposal, to which he suggested returning to racing in the GT class, something which had been interrupted after the 512 BB LM. The overall permission to modify the GTO road car into the Evoluzione for a racing programme however had to be ratified by Eugenio Alzati. He permitted it on conditions that the engineers interested in the project work outside of the Monday to Friday timetable (which was dedicated for development of 328 and other models). The lessons learnt during the development of the engine for the Lancia LC2 could be applied to the racing version of the GTO, such as the carefully engineered conicity of the intake plenums to ensure accurately balanced air flow and pressure to each cylinder and the setup of the turbochargers to produce in excess of 650 bhp.

The GTO Evoluzione included all the necessary modifications (bodywork, chassis, safety systems) to comply with the FIA regulations which permitted 20 cars per year to be specifically built for rally or track racing. Due to multiple deaths and the inherent danger involved with group B rally racing, the Group B Circuit series was suspended at the end of 1986. As a result, the GTO Evo never raced. All GTO road cars came in a stock red color, except one which was black. All GTO Evo cars came in red colour.

Like any Ferrari car, the low production numbers for the GTO were intended to give an exclusive product for the enthusiast buyer. The number of GTO's produced did indeed fit in the minimum requirement of 200 required by the FIA and in fact the factory produced 70 more plus a couple extra to please the Agnelli family, an F1 driver or anybody else who the Commendatore predicted might insist on a last minute purchase option.

Although the production car test team, headed by Dario Benuzzi, did not include any of the Formula 1 drivers, Michele Alboreto occasionally had involvement in giving feedback on cars such as the 288 GTO, and later the 328 Turbo and F40. In particular he agreed with Enzo Ferrari's return to a breed of cars which were much more fiery, describing the GTO as "cattiva" (angry) and praising its low engine centre of gravity compared to the Testarossa.

Engine 
The GTO was based on the rear mid-engine, rear wheel drive 308 GTB, which has a  V8. The 2.85 litre engine capacity was dictated by the FIA's requirement for a turbocharged engine's capacity to be multiplied by 1.4.

Unlike the 308's  engine, the GTO's  V8 was mounted longitudinally, using the 308's rear trunk space. This was necessary to make room for the twin turbochargers and intercoolers. The racing transmission was mounted to the rear of the longitudinal engine, moving the rear differential and wheels aft. The arrangement also let the GTO use a more conventional race-car engine/transmission layout for such things as quick gear-ratio changes for various tracks.

288 GTO in North America
Ferrari did not "federalize" the 288 GTO for sale in America. Americans wanted the car anyway, and obtained it as a grey import vehicle.

Performance 
Test results by Road & Track:
 0–: 2.3 s
 0–: 4.1 s
 0–: 5.0 s
 0–: 6.2 s
 0–: 7.7 s
 0–: 11.0 s
 0–: 16.0 s
 Standing : 14.1 s at 
 Top Speed:

Evoluzione 

Ferrari built six (five production models and one prototype) 288 GTO Evoluzione models with more aggressive and aerodynamic body styling and increased power. The Evoluzione, introduced in 1986, was built to race in Group B but when that series was cancelled the project was also shelved as it was not fit for any other racing series. Ferrari had planned a production run of 20 cars to comply with Group B homologation requirements for Evolution models. The 288 GTO Evoluzione is powered by an upgraded version of the 2.9 L V8 used in the normal 288 GTO that has twin-turbochargers and produces  at 7,800 rpm. It features a unique front end designed for aerodynamics with front canards, channels and vents as well as a large carbon fibre rear spoiler and numerous large NACA ducts. Many styling and mechanical elements from the Evoluzione influenced the soon to follow F40.

All six are thought to still be in existence with one owned by the Factory on display in the engine manufacturing facility in Maranello and another suspected to have been used as a prototype during the development of the F40.

Formula 1 GTO owners
Several Formula 1 drivers were offered GTOs by Enzo Ferrari. These include Michele Alboreto (56195), Keke Rosberg (56653) and Niki Lauda (58329), who was gifted the last of the 272 units built, by Enzo Ferrari himself. Michael Schumacher bought 54233 in April 1996 and drove it with number plate S GT 288.

Awards
In 2004, Sports Car International named this car number two on the list of Top Sports Cars of the 1980s, behind its German rival the Porsche 959.

References

Bibliography
 
 
 
 Ferrari 288 GTO at the Group B Rally Cars

288 Gto
Rear mid-engine, rear-wheel-drive vehicles
Group B cars
Cars introduced in 1984
Sports cars
Cars discontinued in 1987